Hubertus Petrus Maria "Ben" Knapen (born 6 January 1951) is a Dutch historian and politician serving as Minister of Foreign Affairs since 24 September 2021 to 10 January 2022. A member of the Christian Democratic Appeal (CDA), he previously was State Secretary for Foreign Affairs from 2010 to 2012 and parliamentary leader in the Senate from 2019 to 2021.

Career
Knapen was the State Secretary for Foreign Affairs in the first Rutte cabinet, serving from 14 October 2010 to 5 November 2012. His portfolio comprised European Union matters, as well as international aid. Then he was on the advisory board of OMFIF where he was regularly involved in meetings regarding the financial and monetary system.

Other activities
 African Development Bank (AfDB), Ex-Officio Member of the Board of Governors (2010–2012)

Decorations

References

External links

Official
  Dr. H.P.M. (Ben) Knapen Parlement & Politiek
  Dr. H.P.M. Knapen (CDA) Eerste Kamer der Staten-Generaal

1951 births
Living people
Christian Democratic Appeal politicians
Dutch columnists
Dutch corporate directors
Dutch essayists
20th-century Dutch historians
Dutch journalists
Dutch newspaper editors
Dutch nonprofit executives
Dutch nonprofit directors
Dutch political commentators
Dutch political scientists
Dutch political writers
Dutch reporters and correspondents
Dutch republicans
Knights of the Order of Orange-Nassau
Members of the Scientific Council for Government Policy
Members of the Senate (Netherlands)
Ministers of Foreign Affairs of the Netherlands
People from Loon op Zand
Radboud University Nijmegen alumni
Academic staff of Radboud University Nijmegen
State Secretaries for Foreign Affairs of the Netherlands
20th-century Dutch businesspeople
20th-century Dutch civil servants
20th-century Dutch educators
20th-century Dutch male writers
20th-century Dutch politicians
21st-century Dutch businesspeople
21st-century Dutch male writers
21st-century Dutch politicians